Moner Majhe Tumi is a 2002 Bangladesh and India joint venture Bengali-language movie. The movie is the Bengali remake of the 2001 Telugu movie Manasantha Nuvve. The movie was top grossing in Bangladesh for 2002. This film is selected for preservation in Bangladesh Film Archive.

Cast
 Riaz as Benu (Chintu)
 Purnima as Renu (Anu)
 Jisshu Sengupta as Arun
 Biplab Chatterjee as Mohan Sarkar
 Tanu Roy as Shruti
 Siraj Haider as Politician
 Shankar Chakraborty as Haabu
 Moumita Gupta as Rekha, Mohan's wife
 Arpita Dutta Chowdhury
 Rajitha as Mohan's friend & Marriage Broker
 Mita Chaterjee as Grandmother
 Abbas Ullah as Magazine Editor
 Ali Azad 
 Pallab

Music

Soundtrack
The songs and background score were composed by Devendranath Chatterjee, a veteran Bengali composer. All the songs were superhits. The song "Akashe Batase" was reused from the original Telugu film which was itself plagiarized from a Malayalam song titled "Kannadi Koodum Kootti" in the film Pranayavarnangal, sung by singers  K. J. Yesudas and K. S. Chithra. It is composed by South Indian Music Director Vidyasagar. Whereas "Chupi Chupi Kichu Kotha" is reused from Telugu song "Kita Kita Thalupulu" (sung by K. S. Chitra) and "Moner Majhe Tumi" is reused from "Manasantha Nuvve" (sung by Hemachandra and Usha). Both of the songs are from the original film Manasantha Nuvve (2001).

References

Further reading

External links
 

2003 films
2000s Bengali-language films
2003 romantic comedy-drama films
Bengali-language Bangladeshi films
Bangladeshi romantic comedy-drama films
Bengali-language Indian films
Indian romantic comedy-drama films
Bengali remakes of Telugu films
Bangladeshi remakes of Indian films
2003 comedy films
2003 drama films
Bangladeshi remakes of Telugu films